Kepler-705b is a potentially habitable planet orbiting the red dwarf Kepler-705.

See also 

 Kepler-560b

References

Super-Earths in the habitable zone
Exoplanets discovered in 2016
Exoplanets discovered by the Kepler space telescope
Transiting exoplanets